Époisses is a commune in the Côte-d'Or department in eastern France, located around halfway between Dijon and Auxerre.

The village is known for its Époisses cheese, a pungent unpasteurized cows-milk cheese.

Population

See also
Communes of the Côte-d'Or department

References

External links

The impressive medieval and renaissance castle of Époisses
The original Epoisses cheesmaker
Syndicat de défense de l'Époisses: Cheesemakers support group
Village of Époisses: town hall site

Communes of Côte-d'Or